Pusiola verulama is a moth in the  subfamily Arctiinae. It was described by Strand in 1912. It is found in South Africa.

References

Natural History Museum Lepidoptera generic names catalog

Endemic moths of South Africa
Moths described in 1912
Lithosiini
Moths of Africa